Emil Herman Robert Cedercreutz (16 May 1879 – 28 January 1949), was a Finnish Baron, sculptor and silhouette artist best known of his horse sculptures. He was a member of the  family.

Life 
He was influenced by the sculptors like Charles van der Stappen, Constantin Meunier ja Auguste Rodin as well as the Tolstoyan movement.

In 1914 Cedercreutz started working in his new atelier by the river Kokemäenjoki in the municipality of Harjavalta.

Works

References

External links 
Emil Cedercreutz Foundation (in Finnish)
Emil Cedercreutz Museum (in Finnish)

1879 births
1949 deaths
People from Köyliö
People from Turku and Pori Province (Grand Duchy of Finland)
Swedish-speaking Finns
20th-century Finnish nobility
Silhouettists
Tolstoyans
20th-century Finnish sculptors
19th-century Finnish nobility